Mana College is a decile two secondary school in Porirua, Wellington, New Zealand. Mana College celebrated its Golden Jubilee in 2007.

History
In recent years, the college has introduced Pathways a system to help students achieve in areas they need for either trade courses or further tertiary education.

In December 2018 the minister announced that $15 million was to be allocated for redevelopment and replacing old buildings at the college; although this includes $9 million already allocated by the previous government.

Notable alumni
Michael Campbell – professional golfer, US Open Golf champion 2006
Noel Crombie – artist and musician. Former member of Split Enz
Jacob Ellison – rugby union player, Fukuoka Sanix Blues
Tamati Ellison – rugby union player, All Black, New Zealand sevens team, Melbourne Rebels 
Gary Knight – Rugby union player and former All Black
Gary McCormick – radio and television personality
TJ Perenara – rugby union player. Current All Black and Wellington Hurricanes player
Rob Ruha – musician
Tina Salu – footballer, New Zealand Women's Soccer Team
Elvis Seveali'i – rugby union player, Manu Samoa and Wellington Lions
Emmett Skilton – film and television actor
Rodney So'oialo – rugby union player and former All Black
Steven So'oialo – rugby union player, Manu Samoa

References

External links
Official School Website

Educational institutions established in 1957
Secondary schools in the Wellington Region
Schools in Porirua
1957 establishments in New Zealand